Tume Parish is an administrative unit of Tukums Municipality in the Courland region of Latvia. The administrative center is Tume.

Towns, villages and settlements of Tume parish 
 Ezerkauķi
 Gaiļi
 Krīvi
 Tume

See also 
 Jaunmokas Manor

References

External links

Parishes of Latvia
Tukums Municipality
Courland